Anthony Bigeni (born 26 December 1963) is a retired boxer from New Zealand.  He lost to Richard Hall for the World Boxing Association interim cruiserweight world title.

Professional Boxing Titles
New Zealand Boxing Association cruiserweight title (190 Ibs) 1994
WBA - PABA light heavyweight title (174¼ Ibs) 1995
Australasian light heavyweight title (174½ Ibs) 1996
WBA - PABA light heavyweight title (174 Ibs) 1997
WBA - PABA light heavyweight title (174¾ Ibs) 2000
South Pacific cruiserweight title 2001

References

External links

Living people
Cruiserweight boxers
Light-heavyweight boxers
New Zealand male boxers
1963 births